The Angolan Women's Provincial Championships are the second tier women's clubs competition in Angola. The winning team in each province goes on to compete in the national league.

Since women's football tournaments began in 1993, over 30 clubs in Luanda became defunct due to lack of support. At present, Progresso and G.D. Fagec are among the few clubs to maintain a women's football team, even as official competition has halted.

Luanda Provincial Championship 
1995: Blocos FC
1996: Desportivo da Orion
1997: Desportivo da Expresso
1998: Desportivo da Expresso
1999: Progresso do Sambizanga
2000: Desportivo da Expresso
2001: Desportivo da Expresso 
2002: Progresso do Sambizanga
2003: Progresso do Sambizanga

Trivia
 In the 2000 edition, Progresso do Sambizanga thrashed Desportivo do Kilamba Kiaxi 25-0. Guigi, a Progresso striker scored 10 goals.

See also
 Taça de Angola
 Supertaça de Angola

References

2